Halosaccharopolyspora lacisalsi is a halophilic bacterium from the family Pseudonocardiaceae which has been isolated from the salt lake Lop Nur in Xinjiang, China.

References

 

Pseudonocardiales
Bacteria described in 2013
Halophiles